Blake Stephen (born November 29, 1960) is a Canadian former professional ice hockey player.

Stephen played two seasons (1978 - 1980) of major junior hockey in the Western Hockey League with the Billings Bighorns and Saskatoon Blades, registering 40 goals and 54 assists for 94 points, while earning 289  penalty minutes, in 114 games played.

Stephen went on to play five seasons and  213 games in the International Hockey League (IHL).  Stephen  had a reputation as a tough player who could handle his own. While playing in the IHL with the Muskegon Mohawks, Toledo Goaldiggers, and Salt Lake City Golden Eagles, he scored 62 goals and 77 assists for 139 points, while racking up 774 penalty minutes.

Career statistics

References

External links

1960 births
Living people
Billings Bighorns players
Canadian expatriate ice hockey players in the United States
Canadian ice hockey right wingers
Merritt Centennials players
Muskegon Mohawks players
Salt Lake Golden Eagles (IHL) players
Saskatoon Blades players
Ice hockey people from Calgary
Toledo Goaldiggers players